Murder in Three Acts is a 1986 British-American made-for-television mystery film produced by Warner Bros. Television, featuring Peter Ustinov as Agatha Christie's Belgian detective Hercule Poirot. Directed by Gary Nelson, it co-starred Jonathan Cecil as Hastings, Tony Curtis, and Emma Samms.

The film is based on Christie's book Three Act Tragedy (1934), published in the US under the title Murder in Three Acts.

Cast 

 Peter Ustinov as Hercule Poirot
 Jonathan Cecil as Captain Arthur Hastings
 Tony Curtis as Charles Cartwright
 Emma Samms as Jennifer "Egg" Eastman
 Dana Elcar as Dr Strange
 Lisa Eichhorn as Cynthia Dayton
 Nicholas Pryor as Freddie Dayton
 Fernando Allende as Ricardo Montoya
 Pedro Armendáriz, Jr. as Colonel Mateo
 Frances Lee McCain as Miss Milray
 Marian Mercer as Daisy Eastman
 Diana Muldaur as Angela Stafford
 Concetta Tomei as Janet Crisp
Philip Guilmant as Rev. Mr Babbington
Jacqueline Evans as Mrs Babbington
 Martin LaSalle as Doctor
Alma Levy as Nurse
Julio Monterde as Manager

Premise
Poirot joins his assistant Hastings in Acapulco, Mexico, where Hastings is staying. They go to a party at which the other guests include the writer Janet Crisp, the American actor Charles Cartwright, a clergyman called Babbington, Daisy Eastman and her daughter Egg, Dr Strange, and Ricardo Montoya. Babbington dies of poisoning, then Strange is poisoned, too, and Poirot hunts the murderer.

Changes to the original story

The main change is the relocation of the action from London to Acapulco. In the book, Poirot's assistant is Satterthwaite, replacing Hastings, but in the film Hastings is reinstated in his usual role. Christie's English theatrical actor Sir Charles Cartwright turns into Charles Cartwright, an American movie star.

A version made in 2010 in the long Poirot series starring David Suchet restored the title "Three Act Tragedy", as well as reinstating Sir Charles Cartwright (played by Martin Shaw) as an English stage actor.

Prequels & Sequels
In 1974, Murder On The Orient-Express was released, starring Albert Finney as Hercule Poirot. As Finney was unable to reprise his role in 1978, for the sequel, Death On The Nile, Peter Ustinov was cast. He reprised the role for Evil Under The Sun in 1982 and later committed to several made-for-television-films. Apart from Murder In Three Acts, Thirteen At Dinner and Dead Man's Folly were released. Another screen adaption of one of Christie's novels in 1988, Appointment With Death, marked Ustinov's final portrayal of the Belgian detective.

References

External links
 
 
 

1986 television films
1986 films
1980s mystery films
American mystery films
British television films
British mystery films
Films based on Hercule Poirot books
CBS network films
Warner Bros. films
Films directed by Gary Nelson
1980s American films
1980s British films